This is a list of museums in Andorra.

 National Automobile Museum
 Areny-Plandolit house museum
 Andorran postal museum
 Rull house museum
 The Viladomat museum
 The Andorran model museum
 Nicolaï Siadristy's Microminiature museum
 Perfume museum
 Museu Casa Cristo

See also 
 List of libraries in Andorra
 List of archives in Andorra
 List of museums by country

External links 
 The museums of Andorra

Andorra
 
Museums
Andorra